Evan Owen "Bill" Williams (September 26, 1889 – December 21, 1946) was an American football and basketball coach.  He was the 14th head football coach at the Drake University located in Des Moines, Iowa and he held that position for the 1932 season.  His coaching record at Drake was 2–6–1.  Williams was also the head basketball coach at Drake from 1932 to 1943, compiling a record of 113–115.  He was the athletic director at Drake from 1932 to 1940.  Williams committed suicide by hanging himself in a Des Moines hotel on December 22, 1946.

Head coaching record

College football

College basketball

References

External links
 

1889 births
1946 deaths
American men's basketball players
Baseball players from Iowa
Basketball coaches from Iowa
Basketball players from Iowa
Carleton Knights baseball players
Carleton Knights football players
Carleton Knights men's basketball players
Drake Bulldogs athletic directors
Drake Bulldogs football coaches
Drake Bulldogs men's basketball coaches
Huron Screaming Eagles football coaches
Huron Screaming Eagles men's basketball coaches
High school basketball coaches in Minnesota
High school football coaches in Minnesota
People from Fillmore County, Minnesota
People from Howard County, Iowa
Players of American football from Iowa
Suicides by hanging in Iowa
1946 suicides